Health benefit or health benefits  may refer to:
 Health benefits (insurance), a payment received through a health insurance
 Health benefit (medicine), the phenomenon that a food, substance or activity is improving health
 Health claim, a usually unproven claim as to medical health benefits of food, etc.

See also